Italia's Next Top Model, Season 2 is the second season of the Italian reality television show based on the American program of the same name. It is broadcast on SkyVivo, a channel of the Italian subscription television Sky TV. It began airing in September 2008.

The host is once again the Russian former model and actress Natasha Stefanenko. Other permanent judges are Micheal Giannini, art director and talent scout of model agency d’Management, former top model, Gianni Versace's and Giorgio Armani's muse Nadège du Bospertus and fashion journalist Giusi Ferré. Recurring judges are photographer Ciro Zizzo and photographer Settimio Benedusi.

Michela Maggioni was the winner of this season thus receiving a one-year-contract with d’Management Group as well as a Max Factor campaign worth €150,000.

Episode summaries

Episode 1
First aired September 23, 2008

After months of castings throughout Italy, the 30 pre-selected semi-finalists arrive in Milan. They are welcomed by Natasha Stefanenko, the host, and Michael Giannini, art director of d'Management, in a modern luxury hotel where the final castings will take place.

Soon the girls start their individual evaluations in front of the judging panel made up of Natasha, Michael, former top model Nadège, model scouts Danilo Di Pasquale and Anna Peggion. Interesting and determined contestants show up at panel, such as Claudia B., coming from a small village in Sardinia, Claudia C., a karate expert, Diletta, the soccer player, Beatrice, with an ethereal modelesque look, Claudia M., with a wonderful body and a bubbly personality, Giorgia, who shows great self-confidence despite her body flaws and Amy, the Ivorian woman with a hard past reflected in her eyes. Unfortunately, only 20 will continue to the final choice, and the girls are asked to show their walks and potential.

Later on, Natasha reveals the 20 aspiring contestants that have passed the selection and some tears are shed by the eliminated ones. But there is no time for rest for the others, since they must face a photoshoot to show their facial intensity to the judging panel.

After the judges' deliberation Natasha welcomes the girls at the final cast selection. Once chosen, the selected contestants show happiness and joy, but, while leaving the hotel, some of the rejected girls express rude remarks about some picked ones or by saying the judges will regret not casting them.

Episode 2
First aired September 30, 2008

The 14 finalists are sent to the exclusive sea resort of Santa Margherita Ligure to be immediately tested by facing their first photoshoot with famous photographer Settimio Benedusi who also worked for Sports Illustrated. The contestants must pose on rocks with aggressive but modelesque attitude in front of the Ligurian sea while wearing bikinis. Some need to be coached, others perform naturally.

Later the excited girls enter their Milan home, but Natasha's letter inform them they will be judged the following day.

At their first judging Amy and Michela are highly praised for their effortless performance, Beatrice is noted for her high fashion features, whereas Claudia B. disappoints the judges with her unacceptable shot and Noemi produces a vulgar photo. Giorgia and Giulia are told to work on their bodies.

Noemi and Claudia B. land in the bottom two for being uncomfortable at the photoshoot and Claudia B. is sent home for losing her determination in front of the camera and having a bad body posture.

Bottom two: Claudia B. & Noemi Del Falco
Eliminated: Claudia B.
Guest judges: Settimio Benedusi, fashion photographer & Danilo Di Pasquale, model scout

Episode 3
First aired October 7, 2008

In this episode, the girls are announced to get ready for their makeovers, so they reach the Charme&Cheveux salon to find out what they will be. Beatrice sheds a few tears when told to be dyed from blonde to red but she is surprisingly satisfied with the outcome. Michela and Martina get more radical changes as their hair is chopped off but appreciate the result. Almost all the girls are pleasantly happy with the changes with the exception of Claudia C. who does not allow the hairstylist to cut a fringe since for her that haircut is not easy to manage.

The next day the contestants are taken to their first runway challenge where they must walk wearing Love Moschino outfits showing a happy mood. Noemi redeems herself with an effortless performance, Giada demonstrates a huge improvement from her first walk, Martina does not impress, Beatrice is liked by Rossella Jardini, the creative head of Moschino, and Claudia M. has troubles with her shoes too small for her size.

In the judging room, Nadege is appalled and disappointed with most of the girls, Giorgia is critiqued for walking with a sad mood, Claudia M. is warned to have done a step backwards by being too maneater when walking and judge Nadège comments about her excuses, she also says Giulia's performance had horrified her. The judges ask Diletta for more of her presence and deeply scold Claudia C. for her poor performance and bad attitude at the makeovers. Mary is found again to be walking like a soldier despite an entire week of training in runway walking.

Finally Claudia C. and Mary are placed in the bottom two for their dreadful performances but Mary is sent home as her look is considered too commercial and her walk is deemed the worst.
 
Bottom two: Claudia Cuomo & Mary
Eliminated: Mary
Guest designer: Rossella Jardini, creative head of Moschino

Episode 4
First aired October 14, 2008

The twelve remaining girls experience the first problems of cohabitation as Martina argues with Michela over cereals while Diletta is annoyed by Michela's lack of interest in other people's needs. A group made up of Giorgia, Elena, Diletta, Noemi and Martina does not seem to get along well with Michela's personality. Natasha is deeply disappointed with this childish attitude and reminds the girls they are there to compete and show an adult behavior.

This week the contestants take part in their first reward challenge. Judge Giusi Ferré, fashion journalist, gives them a brief lesson on the history of fashion in the 20th century and asks the girls to recreate a vintage look using vintage dresses and clothes from Franco Jacassi's collection. Amy is declared the winner for her elegant look and is awarded with an Emilio Pucci vintage dress.

Then the girls are announced their third elimination challenge. They will pose in two groups for a photoshoot that will be their first printed advertisement where they will be wearing only a pair of Indian Rose jeans and nothing else. Some of them, such as Giorgia and Claudia C., work very well in group while others, like Diletta, need to be coached more.

At panel Nadege is still not convinced by many girls' performances and states that Beatrice is not the kind of model for jeans. Amy is praised for her never boring look, Noemi is found again uncomfortable in front of the camera and Diletta, although showing improvement in the facial expression, is deemed a broken doll about her body position and reprimanded for not listening to the photographer. Giulia is complimented for her eyes' intensity and for working with her body. Elena is found too plain and Martina's face is noticed for her look, despite Nadege's disapproval.

Diletta and Noemi find themselves in the bottom two and Noemi is sent packing for her mature look and inability in the photoshoots that placed her at the bottom of the pack twice in three weeks.

Bottom two: Diletta & Noemi Del Falco
Eliminated: Noemi Del Falco
Special Guest: Franco Jacassi, fashion collection owner

Episode 5
First aired October 21, 2008

After being told to get ready for this week's reward challenge, the eleven remaining girls meet Rajan Tolomei, make-up artist of Max Factor. He teaches the girls a basic lesson on how to create a natural and fresh make-up useful for castings. Then the contestants are asked to recreate the make-up of a Japanese geisha on their faces using photos of geishas. Giorgia, Giulia and Elena do extremely well but is Giorgia who wins the challenge and she shares the prize with Elena. The reward is a phone call to a loved person.

This week the girls will be evaluated on a runway challenge where the contestants must walk wearing the elegant lingerie designed by Madame Chantal Thomass. The designer herself prepares and coaches the girls for the runway where they will interpret the sexy and sophisticated lingerie without being vulgar. At the end Chantal Thomass is quite satisfied with some girls' walks and interpretation.

In the judging session Claudia M., Elena and Giada shine because of their improvements on the runway, Giulia is highly praised for being self-confident despite her curvy thighs. Diletta is found bored and scared while walking but Michael and Nadege defend her for delivering a good walk wearing open shoes with pantyhose that can get slippery. Michela is reprimanded for showing lack of confidence by making grimaces at the end of the runway, Amy is scolded for losing composure and producing an unacceptable performance and so is Claudia C. for her lack of expression.

Claudia C. and Amy land in the bottom two because of their second lackluster performance on the runway and Claudia C. is sent home for always having only an aggressive mood on the runway despite her high fashion look.

Bottom two: Claudia Cuomo & Amy
Eliminated: Claudia Cuomo
Guest designer: Madame Chantal Thomass, lingerie designer
Guest judge: Rajan Tolomei, make-up artist of Max Factor

Episode 6
First aired October 28, 2008

This week the ten aspiring models get a visit from Stefano Fadda, a coolhunter. He explains that, for this week's reward challenge, they must improvise themselves as photographers to do coolhunting in the centre of Milan, taking pictures of people who may anticipate certain fashion trends. Martina is exempt from the challenge, having injured her foot by slipping on the staircase when walking with wet feet. So the nine girls are split into groups of three and sent downtown to take snapshots. Diletta, Elena and Giorgia are declared winners and can spend an evening out in one of Milan's coolest lounge bars.

For this week's elimination the girls participate in a beauty photo shoot with Ciro Zizzo, and they must pose without make-up to show their true potential. Beatrice, Martina and Michela shine according to the photographer, while Diletta, Elena, Giorgia and Giulia struggle and need to be coached.

In the judging room the contestants' photos are shown with and without digital retouching to determine who has a fresh face and who has not. Claudia M. cries when critiqued, Giulia disappoints the panel because of a banal shot and so does Diletta for resting on pretty, Elena is deemed too normal by the photographer. Martina and Amy are praised for their photos and Giorgia surprises the judges with the best shot despite her struggle with the camera.

Diletta and Giulia are paired in the bottom two for not translating their beauty into their pictures and for the amount of coaching needed. Although declared one of the most beautiful girls, Diletta is eliminated for not progressing in the competition because of her weakness and for requiring too much retouching on her photo.

Bottom two: Diletta & Giulia Galizia
Eliminated: Diletta
Special guest: Stefano Fadda, cool-hunter

Episode 7
First aired November 4, 2008

The nine remaining girls face their fourth reward challenge when Susanna Ausoni, stylist and look maker, pays them a visit to teach the contestant how to accessorize a dress properly. Then the aspiring models wear a simple black sheath and are put through a test to evaluate who has learnt the most by accessorizing this simple dress. After single critiques are given, Claudia M. is declared winner of the challenge and is awarded with a shopping trip to a shoe store where she picks a pair of Les Tropeziénnes shoes.

The competition gets tougher and tougher for the contestants as they leave Milan for Genoa, where they will take part in this week's complicated editorial photo shoot. The girls arrive at the monumental cemetery of Staglieno and meet Nicola Majocchi who will be their photographer for this unusual photo shoot. The contestants must impersonate women in mourning while wearing high fashion dresses with a monumental and macabre grave in the background. Elena, Giorgia and Michela show great interpretive skills, but for Amy, Beatrice, and Claudia M. the task seems to be much harder.

Back in Milan, at panel, the judges scold Amy for the sleepy look on her photo and Martina receives warnings to be more present when doing the photoshoots. Judge Nadege is deeply disappointed with Giulia's weight gain and strongly reprimands her for not taking care of her body thus showing a deplorable lack of involvement in the competition. Elena, Giada, Giorgia and Michela shine in their photos according to the panel, while Claudia's performance proves that the photo shoot was too much of an obstacle for her.

Martina and Claudia M. land in the bottom two for their disappointing performances both on set and on picture. After Martina is warned to overcome her limits quickly to be noticed by the panel, Claudia M. is sent home for not impressing the judges enough with her poor results on set and for her lack of expression in the last photo shoots.

Bottom two: Martina & Claudia Manzella
Eliminated: Claudia Manzella
Guest judge: Nicola Majocchi, fashion photographer
Special guest: Susanna Ausoni, stylist and look maker

Episode 8
First aired November 11, 2008

For this week's reward challenge the eight remaining girls face a photo shoot where they must pose in motion while playing tennis. After the contestants get coached in the basic movements, their photographer Ciro Zizzo asks them to express elegance and flexibility even under physical effort. The winner of the challenge is Michela who can get a visit from her mother.

For their weekly elimination challenge the aspiring models are taken at the beautiful neoclassical scenery of Villa Olmo in Como, there they will take part in their first public runway show that evening. They must walk on a runway submerged by ten centimeters of water. The task consists of walking and showing the gowns by being natural despite the difficulty of walking on water. All the girls are scared for this twist but some of them manage to deliver good walks.

In the judging room Giorgia is praised for being more natural compared to her first weeks, Martina is noticed for her improvements, Beatrice gets unanimous praise for her pleasant performance. Michael is extremely disappointed in Elena's failure on this runway and Natasha reprimands her by stating that excuses will not get her anywhere. Nadege scolds Giulia for her heavy walk and for not having the spirit of sacrifice required in a model since she has gained weight the previous weeks, but Michael defends her performance. Then Nadège tells Michela that her performance was overdone. Giada is told to show more confidence as her walk did not impress the panel as the previous ones.

In the end Elena and Giulia land in the bottom two and Giulia gets eliminated for her weight gain that hampered her performance and for lacking the determination and abnegation she declared to have.

Bottom two: Elena Ripamonti & Giulia Galizia
Eliminated: Giulia Galizia
Guest judge: Costantino Della Gherardesca, fashion expert
Special guest: Stefano Lacarbonara, tennis instructor

Episode 9
First aired November 18, 2008

Previously, during this week, the seven remaining contestants received second makeovers to refresh their looks and, despite some initial preoccupation, all were satisfied with the final outcomes.

The girls are announced that for their weekly reward challenge they will be treated like stars. Soon after they are taken to a television studios centre where they meet Cristina Parodi, journalist and fashion expert, who explains that they will be prepared with elegant dresses and make-up to face a fake red carpet event, where they will be evaluated on their presence. The girls must impersonate actresses at their movie premiere and, after posing for the photographers, they are briefly interviewed by Cristina. For handling the questions with a natural attitude Elena is chosen as the winner and decides to share the reward with Giorgia. They will be spending time with Cristina in a luxury Japanese restaurant.

Then the aspiring models are told to get ready for their elimination challenge. The girls will act as sexy women in a TV commercial with the model and actor Sergio Muniz, who is very popular in Italy. They are excited to work with a man and must interpret different types of young women trying to seduce him as follows:

The contestants are asked to pose with sensuality as tempting ladies behind an opening door while the male model walks through a corridor to reach the only woman of his life, his mother, since the commercial celebrates Mother's Day. Some of the girls shine, others, such as Amy and Martina, are found too stiff.

In the judging room all the judges are wowed by Giorgia's constant improvements, Giada impresses the panel with her seductive performance although judge Giusi Ferré finds her a bit ordinary. Michela get praises for adapting to her role. Amy totally disappoints the judges with her sleepy eyes and mechanical movements and Martina is strongly scolded for not being sexy as required.

Amy and Martina are paired in the bottom two for their lackluster performances on set and Amy is sent packing for not being consistent in her improvements and for losing the determination Martina is considered to keep.

Bottom two: Amy & Martina
Eliminated: Amy
Guest judges: Sergio Muniz, model and actor & Danilo Di Pasquale, model scout
Special guests: Cristina Parodi, journalist and fashion expert & Umberto Spinazzola, director

Episode 10
First aired November 25, 2008

The six aspiring models receive a visit from Barbara Ronchi Della Rocca, one of the major experts of etiquette, who will teach them how to behave appropriately when attending a social event that may occur in the public life of a model. For this reward challenge the girls are taught the basis of bon-ton when at the table and soon after they wear elegant dresses to attend a mock aristocratic dinner to show what they have learned. After some laughs are shared for some difficult situations, Martina is declared the winner for quickly learning and showing good manners. She decides to share the prize with Beatrice who was eager of a win. The two girls can telephone to their families and tears are shed during their calls after spending two months with no contacts.

For this week's elimination challenge the contestants are brought to Frankie Morello's atelier where they meet Maurizio Modica and Pierfrancesco Gigliotti, founders and designers of this fashion house. The girls will show their runway skills wearing eccentric complex outfits. After being coached by the stylists about their dresses they get prepared for the task. Many of the aspiring models are confident and after the performance each one is satisfied.

In the judging room this week the judges have contrasting opinions. Martina is praised for her confident walk but is told to avoid her stiff facial expressions, Elena is complimented for delivering a good walk while wearing the most difficult outfit, although she still has to learn how to use her face. Michela is highly praised for her improvements, but Natasha scolds her for wasting the pose at the end of the runway and Nadege says she was lucky with a dress fitting her happy personality, however Michael notices her impressive pose and glance before her exit. Giorgia is reprimanded for looking bored and forgettable when walking and so is Giada for delivering a stiff performance with a bad pose. Beatrice's walk and mood are praised by Michael and the designers but not appreciated by judges Nadège and Giusi since they find it always the same.

After deliberation Giada and Giorgia are placed in the bottom two for their lack of improvement on runway and, although the judges recognise Giada's potential they decide to eliminate her for not overcoming her fears and letting them hamper her walk and presence on the runway.
 
Bottom two: Giada Folcia & Giorgia
Eliminated: Giada Folcia
Guest judges: Maurizio Modica & Pierfrancesco Gigliotti, founders and fashion designers of Frankie Morello
Special guests: Barbara Ronchi Della Rocca, etiquette expert & Renzo Martini, actor

Episode 11
First aired December 2, 2008

The five remaining contestants get letters from their parents and some tears are shed after two months without contacts with their families. The next day the girls are announced that, for their weekly reward challenge, they will take part in a casting for Mariella Burani, noted Italian fashion designer. Casting director Francesca Mezzali evaluates the girls: Giorgia has too big hips for her standards, Elena must walk with more determination, Beatrice is noticed for her good walk and right look, Michela fails to impress because of her playful attitude and gets reprimanded for not taking the casting seriously and Martina is deemed too shy by the way she walks and presents herself. Some of them are ordered to be faster when getting dressed. Beatrice wins the challenge and can spend the entire afternoon out shopping, in addition she wins an expensive Mariella Burani's purse.

This week's photoshoot will take place in Galleria Vittorio Emanuele II, located in the very centre of Milan. There the contestants will be photographed by the renowned photographer Settimio Benedusi while suspended in the air, floating with peacock-inspired long dresses. After a demonstration from Natasha they get coached about the movements. Each aspiring model is asked to express dynamism and lightness at the same time. Elena shines after overcoming her fear of heights while Michela loses her focus.

At panel Beatrice is critiqued for her legs' and arms' stiffness and is reprimanded for not giving enough, despite producing an overall acceptable photo. Martina is praised by the photographer for taking directions well and expressing the requested emotion although Nadège does not like the result. Giorgia is deemed too heavy in her shot for not being able to balance her body thus looking lifeless to the judges. Elena is highly praised for working with her body and assuming a positive attitude on set, taking directions and giving various poses to the photographer like a professional model. With her performance Michela upsets Natasha, Michael and Nadege who heavily scold her for being unprofessional on set, playing rather than focusing, thus making a step backwards.

Michela and Giorgia land in the bottom two and Michela is saved for effortless producing a good shot but is warned to grow up. Giorgia is eliminated for reaching her limit in the competition despite her previous constant improvements.

Bottom two: Michela Maggioni & Giorgia
Eliminated: Giorgia
Guest judges: Settimio Benedusi, fashion photographer & Marta Citacov, fashion journalist
Special guest: Francesca Mazzali, casting director of fashion designer Mariella Burani

Episode 12
First aired December 9, 2008

The four remaining contestants leave Milan for Capri, one of Italy's most fashionable islands and a sea resort noted for inspiring such designers as Coco Chanel. After visiting the town and discovering the local fashion the girls face their last reward challenge: they will pose in pairs as mannequins in the windows of the local Valentino boutique, wearing the designer's elegant dresses. For totally embodying the spirit of a living mannequin Beatrice is declared the winner and can get a pair of Sandali Capresi, the typical shoes of Capri.

Later the girls take part in this week's photo shoot: they pose as sensual and sophisticated ladies on their yacht with Capri's reefs in the background. The task requires them to balance their bodies on wedge-heeled shoes while standing and showing their '80s-inspired outfits. All the girls manage to focus and deliver a good performance.

Back in Milan, in the judging room, Elena gets universal praises for her body pose, facial expression and effort to make the most of her outfit, although Nadege reminds her she lucked into her pose. Beatrice is praised by Michael and Nadege for her photo and her modern icy beauty, while the photographer Settimio Benedusi points out her stiffness during the shooting. Michela is highly appreciated by Natasha and all the panel for her results and professionalism after her unprofessional behavior on the previous set. Martina is noticed for showing more femininity with her intense look and facial expression, although Nadege still finds her body too masculine.

After a difficult deliberation Beatrice and Martina are left in the bottom two and Beatrice is spared for her constant results and high fashion look. Martina is eliminated because, although delivering her best performance, the judges think her determination can not make up for being still less impressive than the other finalists.
 
Bottom two: Beatrice Coos & Martina
Eliminated: Martina
Guest judge: Settimio Benedusi, fashion photographer

Episode 13
First aired December 16, 2008

The three finalists face their next to last challenge posing for a Marie Claire-cover inspired photoshoot. All of them perform well showing self-confidence and professionalism. Elena is satisfied with this challenge since for her is a revenge after her bland beauty shot. Beatrice and Michela are determined to stay in the competition.

At judging the girls get universal praises for their results and achievements in the competition. Antonella Antonelli, editor of Italian Marie Claire magazine, tells Michela that her shot could be an actual cover and appreciates her modern face. Elena is noticed for using her beauty to her advantage thus producing a captivating shot and getting praised for not being a useless beauty anymore. Beatrice is praised for her elegance though her important dress on the photo may distract from her face.

Following a difficult deliberation the three contestants are all called in front of Natasha and commended for getting this far. Michela is called first and Elena is saved soon after, so Beatrice brokes into tears after her elimination and is comforted by Natasha before leaving.

Bottom two: Beatrice Coos & Elena Ripamonti
Eliminated: Beatrice Coos
Guest judges: Paolo Candian, fashion photographer & Rajan Tolomei, make-up artist of Max Factor

Then the two finalists are driven to Verona, at the main atelier of Byblos, an important Italian fashion house. There Elena and Michela will face their last challenge: a runway show with professional models where they are asked to show three different outfits each, walking with self-confidence, elegance and strength. Both the girls do their best and are happy to be in the final runway after overcoming the hostility they had at the beginning of the competition.

In their last judging session Natasha and Michael show their pride for the girls' achievements. Elena is commended for delivering a truly confident walk with a captivating and determined glance and the judges are amazed at her improvements that transformed her from beautiful girl into a model. Although judge Rajan states that her beauty gives her a more commercial appeal she is praised for being able to change in the competition. Then Michela is commended by Nadege for her effortless talent on set and her performance on the final runway, and, although Michael reminds her of a flaw in her second exit, she has convinced the judges of being capable to perform as a professional model.

After a really tough deliberation the two remaining contestants are called back in the judging room and Natasha reveals that Michela is the new Italia's Next Top Model thanks to her natural posing talent and her new improved model attitude and walk.

Final two: Elena Ripamonti e Michela Maggioni
Runner-up: Elena Ripamonti
Italia's Next Top Model: Michela Maggioni
Special guest: Manuel Facchini, designer and creative head of Byblos
Guest judge: Rajan Tolomei, make-up artist of Max Factor

Contestants
(ages stated are at start of contest)

Summaries

Call-Out Order

 The contestant was eliminated 
 The contestant won the competition

 The first call-out does not reflect the girls' actual performances this first week.
 Episode 1 and 2 did not have reward challenges.

References

External links 
 
 Italia's Next Top Model Official Site

2008 Italian television seasons